Lists of windmills in Yorkshire, divided by county:

List of windmills in the East Riding of Yorkshire
List of windmills in North Yorkshire
List of windmills in South Yorkshire
List of windmills in West Yorkshire

Buildings and structures in Yorkshire
Lists of windmills in England
Windmills